Intertribal and pantribal are terms indicating an activity, organization, or event that extends across American Indian tribal boundaries, is common to multiple tribes, or involves the actions of more than one tribe.

American Indian Movement (AIM)
Intertribal Council On Utility Policy & CERT
Pan-Indianism
Pantribal sodalities
Pow wow